Meidrim Road Section  a road cut that shows the geology of the Llanvirn-Caradoc age. It is a Site of Special Scientific Interest in Carmarthen & Dinefwr,  Wales.

See also
List of Sites of Special Scientific Interest in Carmarthen & Dinefwr

References

Sites of Special Scientific Interest in Carmarthen & Dinefwr